U class or Class U may refer to:

British U-class submarine, submarines built just before and during World War II
U-class destroyer, destroyers of the Royal Navy launched in 1942–1943
SR U class, 2-6-0 steam locomotives built for the Southern Railway
GNRI Class U, 4-4-0 steam locomotives built for the Great Northern Railway, Ireland
NER Class U, 0-6-2 steam locomotives built for the North Eastern Railway
NZR U class, 4-6-0 steam locomotives built for New Zealand Railways
Russian locomotive class U, 4-6-0 steam locomotives
South African Class U 2-6-2+2-6-2, steam locomotives
Class U special wagon, railway goods wagons

See also
 UCLASS
 SR U1 class